Greg Palmer (born 1909) was an Australian filmmaker. He went on to set up radio station 3AK in Melbourne.

He later went into travel, setting up Atlas World Tours. He also worked in three-dimensional films.

Filmography
The Mail Robber (1925)
The Northbound Limited (1927)

References

External links
Greg Palmer at National Film and Sound Archive

1909 births
Year of death missing